HMS Colossus was a 80-gun second rate  ship of the line built for the Royal Navy in the 1840s. The ship was fitted with steam propulsion in 1854–1855, and was sold for scrap in 1867.

Description
The Vanguard class was designed by Sir William Symonds, Surveyor of the Navy, with each ship built with a slightly different hull shape to evaluate their speed and handling characteristics. The ship's tonnage was 2,583  tons burthen. The Vanguards had a wartime crew of 720 officers and ratings.
 
The Vanguard class ships of the line were armed with twenty 32-pounder (56 cwt) cannon and two 68-pounder carronades on her lower gundeck, twenty-eight 32-pounder (50 cwt) cannon and another pair of 68-pounder carronades on the upper gundeck. On her quarterdeck were fourteen 32-pounder (42 cwt) cannon and on the forecastle deck were eight more 32-pounder (42 cwt) cannon.

Modifications
When Colossus was ordered to be modified for steam propulsion in 1854, she was fitted with a two-cylinder horizontal trunk steam engine of 400 nominal horsepower that drove a single propeller shaft.

Construction and career
[[File:HM Divisional Ships of the Gun-Boat Flotilla, at Moorings off Ryde - 1856.jpg|thumb|HM Divisional Ships of the Gun-Boat Flotilla, at moorings off Ryde, 1856. Colossus (second left), Capt. Keppel]]Colossus was ordered from Pembroke Dockyard on 18 March 1839 and laid down in October 1843. She was launched on 1 June 1848 and completed on 3 July. The ship was not fitted out and Colossus was placed in ordinary. Her construction cost £59,119. Between January 1854 and June 1855, she was fitted with steam propulsion.Colossus was sold for scrap on March 1867.

Notes

Citations

References
Lavery, Brian (2003) The Ship of the Line - Volume 1: The Development of the Battlefleet 1650-1850.'' Conway Maritime Press. .

External links 
 

Ships of the line of the Royal Navy
Vanguard-class ships of the line
Ships built in Pembroke Dock
1848 ships